DGZ may refer to:
 Die Goldenen Zitronen, a German music band
 Demigodz, an American Hip Hop group formed by Rapper Apathy
 "dgz", the Daga language ISO 639-3 code